St. David's High School or similar may refer to:

United States
St. David High School (Arizona) in St. David, Arizona
St. David High School, a component of St. David's School

United Kingdom
St. David's RC High School, Dalkeith, Midlothian, Scotland
St. David's High School, Saltney

Elsewhere
SMK Tinggi St David (also known as St. David's High School), Malacca, Malaysia

See also
 St. David School (disambiguation)
 St. David's School (disambiguation)
 St David's College (disambiguation)